Puneet Issar (born 6 November 1959) is an Indian actor, writer,  director, producer and dialect coach best known for his works in Hindi films and television shows. Issar started his acting career as a villain in the Manmohan Desai's 1983 film Coolie, but gained recognition with the portrayal of Duryodhana in B. R. Chopra's television series Mahabharat (1988–1990).

Following Mahabharat, Issar acted in notable films including Chandra Mukhi (1993), Prem Shakti (1994), Ram Jaane (1995), Border (1997), Refugee (2000), Krrish (2006), Bachna Ae Haseeno (2008), Ready (2011), Son of Sardaar (2012) and The Kashmir Files (2022). His first directorial was Salman Khan starrer cop film Garv (2004), in which he also co-wrote the screenplay with wife Deepali.

Besides Mahabharat, Issar also went on to be part of television shows like Param Vir Chakra (1987), Bharat Ek Khoj (1988), Junoon (1993-1998), Noorjahan (1999-2000), Mahabharat (2013), Parchhayee: Ghost Stories by Ruskin Bond (2019) and Choti Sarrdaarni (2021). He was a contestant in the reality television show Bigg Boss 8 (2014–2015), hosted by Khan. Formerly, he worked as dialect coach at various acting institutions, and his expertise included speech, diction and physical gestures.

Personal life
Issar is married to Deepali. The couple have two children, daughter Nivriti Issar and son Siddhant Issar. Siddhant is also an actor. He wrote, directed and produced a short film named Resurrection- Jaago Aur Jiyo (2020), he also acted in it. The short film was based on the topic of suicide prevention and mental health awareness during the corona lockdown. It's an issue-based film that gives a message.

Issar is a fitness and gym enthusiast. He also made some positive headlines for fitness at the age of 60.

Career
Issar has starred as a villain in over 150 films,  such as Zakhmi Aurat, Jagruti, Kal Ki Aawaz, Palay Khan, Teja, Prem Shakti and opposite stars like Mohanlal, Salman Khan and Akshay Kumar. He also played a villain in the Shah Rukh Khan starrer Ram Jaane. He appeared in the hit war film Border. He played the role of Parashurama in 2013 Mahabharata and Duryodhana in the epic TV series Mahabharat (1988–1990) which brought him mainstream popularity.

He played the Indian Superman, a Bollywood version of the Hollywood films. He played the second lead in the cult Indian horror film Purana Mandir in 1983. Later he did many other horror movies such as Tehkhana in the 1980s.

He also starred in movies such as Krrish, Partner, Aryan, Bachna Ae Haseeno and many more in the 2000s.

He has also directed TV serials such as Hindustani and Jai Mata Ki starring Hema Malini. He has starred in over 12 TV serials such as Junoon, Sahil, Noor Jahan, Vikram Aur Betaal and many more. He has appeared in over 1800 episodes on Indian television. He played the role of King Bimbisara in the feature film Gautama Buddha – The Life and Times of Gautama Buddha. He also starred in Left Right Left of the Indian Channel Sab TV. He has also worked in a number of Punjabi films such as Rab Ne Banayian Jodiyan and in a few Telugu films. He has also given a brilliant display of his acting skills in the mythological film Suryaputra Shanidev, which released in 1997.

In 2004, Issar directed the film Garv: Pride and Honour starring Salman Khan and Shilpa Shetty in lead roles. The opening collections of the film were good, and overall it was declared "Above Average" at the box office. His latest directorial venture I Am Singh, the story of which is also written by him, released in December 2011.

In the Indian TV reality show Bigg Boss season 8, in 2014/2015, Issar was one of the 7 finalists. He was evicted from the show 3 January 2015. Issar lasted in the house for 105 days. At 56, he was the oldest contestant to do so and last the entire season in the house. He is playing "Daar ji" in Choti Sarrdaarni since 2021.

In 2022, Issar played DGP Hari Narain in The Kashmir Files, a film based on the Exodus of Kashmiri Pandits.

Filmography

Films

Television

Other credits

References

External links

 
 Puneet Issar on Bollywood Hungama
 

1959 births
Living people
Male actors in Hindi cinema
Indian male television actors
Film directors from Mumbai
Male actors in Telugu cinema
Indian male film actors
Male actors in Malayalam cinema
Male actors in Kannada cinema
Male actors in Bengali cinema
Male actors in Punjabi cinema
20th-century Indian male actors
21st-century Indian male actors
Male actors from Mumbai
20th-century Indian film directors
21st-century Indian film directors
Film producers from Mumbai
Male actors in Hindi television
Male actors in Telugu television
Bigg Boss (Hindi TV series) contestants